The CONCACAF Gold Cup is North America's major tournament in senior men's soccer and determines the continental champion. Until 1989, the tournament was known as CONCACAF Championship. It is currently held every two years. From 1996 to 2005, nations from other confederations have regularly joined the tournament as invitees. In earlier editions, the continental championship was held in different countries, but since the inception of the Gold Cup in 1991, the United States are constant hosts or co-hosts.

From 1973 to 1989, the tournament doubled as the confederation's World Cup qualification. CONCACAF's representative team at the FIFA Confederations Cup was decided by a play-off between the winners of the last two tournament editions in 2015 via the CONCACAF Cup, but was then discontinued along with the Confederations Cup.

Mexico are the most successful team in the history of CONCACAF continental championships. They have won the most titles, with eleven (eight in the Gold Cup era), and hold various records. They hosted the tournament once, in 1977, and were co-hosts with the United States in 1993 and 2003. On all three occasions, Mexico won the title on home soil.

Overall record

Match overview

Winning finals

The CONCACAF Championships have been played in round-robins rather than knock-out matches. For the three titles in that era, the decisive matches are listed.

Record by opponent

Mexico does not have a negative record against any team from CONCACAF. Panama is the only one with a balanced tally. However, due to losses against invitees, they have negative records against Colombia and South Africa. Notably, they were matched up with record World Champion Brazil three times, and won all three matches without conceding.

Record players

Andrés Guardado is Mexico's record player at continental championships. He has won the title three times, twice as captain in 2015 and 2019. From the pre-Gold Cup era, the most fielded player is defender Jesús del Muro, with 13 matches from 1963 to 1967.

Top goalscorers

Awards and records

Team awards
Winners (11): 1965, 1971, 1977, 1993, 1996, 1998, 2003, 2009, 2011, 2015, 2019
 Runners-up (3): 1967, 2007, 2021
 Third place (5): 1973, 1981, 1991, 2013, 2017
 Fair play award: 2011

Individual awards
 Most Valuable Player: 
 Jorge Campos (1991)
 Ramón Ramírez (1993)
 Raúl Lara (1996)
 Jesús Arellano (2003)
 Giovani Dos Santos (2009)
 Javier Hernández (2011)
 Andrés Guardado (2015)
 Raúl Jiménez (2019)
 Héctor Herrera (2021)

 Golden Boot:
 Ernesto Cisneros (1965, 5 goals)
 Víctor Rangel (1977, 6 goals)
 Hugo Sánchez (1981, 3 goals)
 Benjamín Galindo (1991, 4 goals)
 Luís Roberto Alves (1993, 11 goals)
 Luis Hernández (1998, 4 goals) (shared)
 Miguel Sabah (2009, 4 goals)
 Javier Hernández (2011, 7 goals)

 Best Goalkeeper:
 Oswaldo Sánchez (2003)
 Guillermo Ochoa (2019)

 Best Young Player:
 Jesús Corona (2015)

Team records

 Most titles (11)
 Most titles in a row (3, 1993–1998)
 Most tournament participations (22)
 Most matches (117)
 Most victories (80)
 Most goals (258)
 Most goals in a single tournament (28, 1993)
 Only team to win a tournament without conceding (1996 and 2003)
 Highest victory (9–0 over Martinique, 11 July 1993)
 Highest victory in a final/Most goals in a final (5–0 over United States, 2009)

Individual records

 Most goals in one tournament: Luís Roberto Alves (11, 1993)
 Most goals in one match: Luís Roberto Alves (7, against Martinique, 11 July 1993)

References

RSSSF archives and results
Soccerway database

Countries at the CONCACAF Gold Cup
Mexico national football team